Storage is a 2009 Australian horror film directed by Michael Craft and starring Saskia Burmeister and Robert Mammone.

It had its world premiere at the 2009 Dungog Film Festival.

References

External links

Official website

Australian horror films
2000s English-language films
2000s Australian films